Forestville Hockey Club is a field hockey club in Adelaide, South Australia.

History

Forestville Hockey Club was formed in 1905 by Harry Cowham in an effort to get people living in Unley, South Australia, interested in playing hockey. Forestville competed in that year against: St John's, Sturt, West Torrens, Rosemount, East Torrens, Bankville and North Adelaide. Forestville is the oldest of the South Australian clubs and it is believed to be the oldest playing in Australia. The club's first 'pitch' was in a paddock near Leah St. Forestville, not far from its present Goodwood Oval location. Forestville play a majority of their home games at the State Hockey Centre. The venue has been home to Forestville games since 1992.

Australian representatives

 Trevor Smith (1976–1984)
 Terry Smith (1980–1985)
 Roger Smith (1988)
 Paul Lewis  (1992–1996)
 Tom Wickham (2013–present)

Achievements

South Australian Hockey Association men's A grade best and fairest winners:

 1935 Harry Cowham
 1943 Robert Ritchie
 1964 Geoff Sharples
 1967 Geoff Sharples
 1989 Roger Smith
 1990 Roger Smith
 1992 Roger Smith

Panther Press

Forestville publishes a monthly newsletter, "The Panther Press".

See also
 List of sporting clubs in Adelaide
 List of South Australian hockey clubs

External links
Forestville Hockey Club website
Hockey SA website
Panther Press
Forestville History Association

Australian field hockey clubs
1905 establishments in Australia
Field hockey clubs established in 1905
Sporting clubs in Adelaide